Montana Sky is a Canadian country music group. Their 1997 single "Underneath the Moon" reached the Top 20 of the RPM Country Tracks chart. They later returned to the Top 20 with their 1998 single "A Whole Lot of Love." After disbanding for several years, founding members Larry MacDonald, Keith Kirkpatrick and Tim Lee reunited in 2009 with new members Darren Bailey and Rick Wigle.

The band returned to the studio in late 2011 to begin recording the album "Full Circle," the first with new members Darren Bailey and Rick Wigle. "Full Circle" was released in January 2013 and is available on iTunes.

Larry MacDonald is the son of Boyd and Shirley MacDonald who named "Stompin Tom Connors."

Discography

Albums

Singles

References

External links
 

Canadian country music groups